Baruwal or Baduwal or Barwal is a surname belonging to the Khas people of the Chhetri caste from Nepal. It is believed that Baruwal are originated in Nepal at Western before unification of modern Nepal. Sinja, a beautiful landscape of Jumla district is considered as origin of all Baruwal. How were they arrived in Sinja? It is believed that Sinja is business hub and route of India and Tibet. Indian businessmen were passed through Sinja regularly with escorting of Baruwal youth and adult. Physically, they were very strong, robust, dynamic and well. So, Security was on their hand. After passing long periods, they used Sinja as their shelter and interacted with local people and society. This was life step in Sinja to Baruwal which was become their origin. Baruwal migrated from India as escort force. It is still being story not fact. Their main occupation is animal husbandry (Sheep) and harvesting.

Distribution in Nepal:

Unification of modern Nepal, they dispatched all over the country. They joined in security force in post and neo period of modern Nepal. Mostly Baruwal are living in Kathmandu, Dhading, Ramechhap, Myagdi, Parbat, Pokhara, Chitwan(especially Bharatpur), Jhapa and Western districts. The term Baruwal was derived from Baduwal. In Western Part of the country, it is still in used as surname. But, Baruwal is using at mid-western, central and eastern part.

Notable people with the surname include:
Bhagat Bahadur Baduwal, Nepalese politician
Karuna Badwal, Indian politician

References

Ethnic groups in Nepal
Nepali-language surnames
Khas surnames
Kshatriya communities
Hindu surnames